Several publications have been issued under the name National Magazine, including:

 Magazine of Western History, known as The National Magazine from 1891 to 1894
 The National Magazine (1896), published from 1894 to 1896 as The Bostonian, and from 1896 to 1933 under the new name
 The National Sunday Magazine, published on a semimonthly basis during the early part of the 20th century by the Abbott & Briggs Company. Wilbur Griffith was the editor.

See also
 Nat Mags, or National Magazine Company, a British magazine publisher